Bruno Piñatares Prieto (born 25 June 1990) is a Uruguayan footballer who plays as a defensive midfielder for Ecuadorian club Barcelona SC.

Club career

Early career
Born in Montevideo, Piñatares began his career with Baby Fútbol Dryco. He later played for Nacional before joining Rentistas, where he finished his formation.

Piñatares made his first team debut 2007, at the age of 16; his side was eventually relegated from Primera División at the end of the campaign. He would later feature more regularly in the following years, in Segunda División.

Piñatares moved to fellow second division side Boston River in 2010, being a regular starter. In July 2013, he returned to Rentistas, with the club now back in the top tier.

Portuguesa
On 11 July 2014, Piñatares moved abroad for the first time in his career, joining Campeonato Brasileiro Série B side Portuguesa. He featured regularly during the 2014 Série B, suffering relegation, but lost his starting spot in the 2015 Campeonato Paulista and subsequently left the club in May 2015.

Cerro
In June 2015, Piñatares returned to his home country after agreeing to a contract with Cerro in the first division. He was a regular starter as his side qualified to the 2017 Copa Libertadores.

Western Sydney Wanderers
On 29 June 2016, Piñatares signed for Australian club Western Sydney Wanderers. Unable to establish as a regular starter, he was released on 11 May 2017.

River Plate Montevideo
In July 2017, Piñatares returned to Uruguay to play for River Plate Montevideo, also in the top tier. An immediate starter, he only missed one match during the season, as his side finished in a mid-table position.

Delfín
On 2 January 2018, Piñatares moved to Ecuadorian Serie A side Delfín, managed by compatriot Guillermo Sanguinetti. He helped his side to win the league for the first time in their history in the 2019 campaign, also scoring in the semifinals against Macará.

Barcelona SC
On 3 January 2020, Piñatares was announced at Barcelona also in the Ecuadorian top tier, reuniting with his former Delfín manager Fabián Bustos. He also became a starter for his new side, winning another Serie A title in 2020 and helping his side to reach the semifinals of the 2021 Copa Libertadores.

Career statistics

Honours
Delfín
Ecuadorian Serie A: 2019

Barcelona SC
Ecuadorian Serie A: 2020

References

External links

1990 births
Living people
Footballers from Montevideo
Uruguayan footballers
Association football midfielders
Uruguayan Primera División players
C.A. Rentistas players
Boston River players
Club Atlético River Plate (Montevideo) players
C.A. Cerro players
Western Sydney Wanderers FC players
Campeonato Brasileiro Série B players
Associação Portuguesa de Desportos players
A-League Men players
Ecuadorian Serie A players
Delfín S.C. footballers
Barcelona S.C. footballers
Uruguay youth international footballers
Uruguayan expatriate footballers
Uruguayan expatriate sportspeople in Brazil
Uruguayan expatriate sportspeople in Australia
Uruguayan expatriate sportspeople in Ecuador
Expatriate footballers in Brazil
Expatriate soccer players in Australia
Expatriate footballers in Ecuador